The Bendix Hyde Carbine is a light rifle concept made by George Hyde, while he was the chief gun designer for the Inland Division of General Motors during World War II. The weapon design is similar to that of the Thompson submachine gun, except that it is gas operated.

References
Bendix Hyde carbine

.30 Carbine firearms
Assault rifles
Rifles of the United States
Trial and research firearms of the United States
Carbines
Bendix Corporation